The 1928 Faversham by-election was a parliamentary by-election held in January 1928 for the British House of Commons constituency of Faversham, in Kent.

Previous MP 
The Conservative MP, Sir Granville Wheler died. He had been the MP since re-gaining the seat from the Liberals in January 1910.

Previous Result

Candidates 
Forty-three-year-old Adam Maitland was selected by the local Conservatives to defend the seat. 
Labour changed their candidate when they chose 44-year-old Dudley Leigh Aman. He had contested Petersfield in 1922, 1923 and Thanet in 1924. 
The Liberals selected 54-year-old John Freeman Dunn who had been Liberal MP for Hemel Hempstead from 1923-24. 
E.A. Hailwood, who had contested Southend and Northampton as an Independent Conservative, was standing in his third by-election. His appearance at this by-election resulted in some Conservative party members 'offering violence'.

Result

Aftermath 
Maitland held the seat at the 1929 general election, again defeating Aman. At those elections, Dunn unsuccessfully fought Chichester.

References
 British Parliamentary Election Results 1918-1949, compiled and edited by F.W.S. Craig (The Macmillan Press 1979)

1928 elections in the United Kingdom
1928 in England
Faversham
Politics of Swale
1920s in Kent